Elections to Chorley Borough Council were held on 7 May 1998.  One third of the council was up for election and the Labour party kept overall control of the council.

After the election, the composition of the council was:

Election result

Ward results

Adlington

Anderton, Heath Charnock and Rivington

Anglezarke, Heapey and Wheelton

Chorley East

Chorley North East

Chorley North West

Chorley South East

Chorley South West ward

Chorley West ward

Clayton-le-Woods East

Clayton-le-Woods West and Cuerden

Coppull North ward

Coppull South ward

Eccleston and Heskin

Euxton North

Mawdesley

Whittle-le-Woods

References
"Council poll results", The Guardian 9 May 1998 page 16
Election results: CHORLEY
Lib Dems are ready to test their popularity

1998 English local elections
1998
1990s in Lancashire